Northwest Christian High School (NCHS) is a private school in Thurston County, Washington. It is part of Northwest Christian Schools of Lacey, Washington, which also includes Northwest Christian Preschool and Northwest Christian Academy (Lacey, Washington) (for pre-school and K-8 students). In the 2006-2007 school year, it provided education for 206 students in grades 9 through 12. Its motto is "Developing Christian Leaders." In 2019, the school’s nickname changed from the Navigators to the Wolverines (a nickname that now includes the Preschool and the Academy). Its mascot is a wolverine who has yet to be named, and its colors are navy, teal, white, and gray. Northwest Christian High School provides college preparatory academics, a variety of elective classes, competitive sports, and TOEFL preparation. Class sizes are very small averaging around 15-20.

History
Founded in 1995, the original location of the school was in the basement of Capitol Christian Center located in downtown Olympia, Washington. The first graduating class was in 1999 and about that time the student body numbered approximately 75.

Academics
Standard courses offered every year

As well as
Government, Economics, P.E., and  Spanish (1, 2, 3 and 4).

Elective courses can vary from year to year, depending on interest and availability of teachers, but currently include English (Creative Writing, Yearbook, Journalism), History (Senior History Seminar), Math (Geometry, Statistics, Discrete Math), Bible (Freedom in Christ, Romans, Missio Dei), Science (Honors Biology, Science Seminar), P.E. (Health & Fitness), Spanish (Spanish 4 and 5).

The school is active and successful in several academic competitions including:

Knowledge Bowl: Since 2001, when it first fielded a team, teams have qualified for State competition every year, and in every year but the first, finished in the top nine in Division 2B. In 2012, it won the 2B state championship, followed by two third place finishes in 2013 and 2014.
Academic Decathlon: 2007 and 2008 Washington State Small School Champions.
ACSI (Association of Christian Schools International) Math League: 2007 Regional Champions in Algebra 1, Algebra 2, and Calculus; 2008 Regional Champions in Algebra 1, Algebra 2, Pre-Calculus, and Calculus (tie); 2009 Regional Champions in Algebra 2; 2010 Regional Champions in Algebra 2 and Pre-Calculus.

Teaching staff
The teaching staff is composed of Christian adults, the majority of whom have degrees in their associated fields.

Sports
Football, Boys' and Girls' Tennis, Girls' Volleyball (went to State in 2009), Cross Country (recently, Girls 2006, 2007, 2008, 2009, 2010, 2011, 2012, 2013, 2014 State Champions, Division 2B; Boys 2006 3rd, 2007 2nd in State, 2008 and 2009 State Champions, 2010 3rd, Division 2B), 2014 State Champions , Track and Field (Girls 2007 1st and 2008 2nd in State, Division 2B), Boys' and Girls' Basketball (Boys went to State in 2008; Girls went to State in 2010), Baseball (2008 4th in State, 2009 State Champions, Division 2B), Fastpitch, Golf, Powerlifting (Girls 2010 and 2011 and 2012 State Champions). The volleyball and cross country teams win academic awards from the Washington Interscholastic Activities Association (WIAA); member of 2011 cross country team earn about $450,000 in academic and athletic scholarships; NCHS girls' cross country team won the state record---nine consecutive state championship; NCHS powerlifting wins third consecutive state championship, a National Amateur Athletic Union (AAU) 
Championship and fields teams at the AAU International / World Championships; NCHS girls' track places second in the state championships.

Cross country
The Women's Cross Country team has had 2006, 2007, 2008, 2009, 2010, 2011, 2012, 2013, and 2014 State Championships, the first team in Washington state history to win nine consecutive state wins in a row, along with many league and district championships as well. On the Men's side, they have placed 3rd in 2006, 2nd in 2007, and 1st in both 2008 and 2009 in division 2B. In 2010 and 2013, they got 3rd place overall. The men won the 2014 state championship in state record time. In addition, the boys and girls were ranked among the best teams in the nation during the 2014 season in Division 2. Cross Country was coached by Bill Kehoe who had won multiple Coach of the Year awards for his work with the women's team before retiring in the summer before the 2010 season. The 2010 through 2014 seasons were coached by head coach Larry Weber and assistant coach Mike Michael.

Coaches
Coach ANDERSON - Tennis (boys)
Coach LIZZE - Varsity Volleyball
Coach LASH - JV Volleyball
Coach COLLINS - Basketball (girls)
Coach FORD - Varsity Baseball
Coach TIGGES - Basketball
Coach MICHAEL - Head Track and Cross Country Coach
Coach HOLLIS - Powerlifting
Coach Dunn - Football

External links
Home page

High schools in Thurston County, Washington
Private high schools in Washington (state)
Lacey, Washington
Educational institutions established in 1995
1995 establishments in Washington (state)